Public Citizen Texas is the Texas branch of Public Citizen, a nonpartisan, ideologically progressive, nonprofit, public interest advocacy organization. Public Citizen Texas is based in Austin, Texas. Since its founding in 1984, it has concerned itself with ideologically progressive issues such as: environmental enforcement policies, global warming, promoting renewable/clean energy, product safety, nuclear safety, medical safety, auto safety/quality, pesticide safety, insurance reforms, campaign finance/ethics issues, improving state government agency operations and fair trade policies.  In recent years the organization has been primarily concerned with global warming and energy policy in Texas. Public Citizen Texas opposes expanding coal burning and nuclear power plants in Texas1.

Founding
Public Citizen Texas was founded in on August 21, 1984, by Ralph Nader and Craig McDonald, Public Citizen's national field organizer, with the purpose of fighting Southwestern Bell’s rate hikes, which occurred after the deregulation of phone Rates.  After Southwestern Bell withdrew the increase, the group decided to remain in Texas and pursue issues including consumer safety, government ethics and pollution.2

Tom “Smitty” Smith
In 1985, Public Citizen Texas recruited Tom “Smitty” Smith, director of the Houston Food Bank and former legislative aid to be the organization's director, a position he has held until he retired in 2017. He has also serves on the boards of Clean Water Action, the Texas Wind Power Coalition, Texans for Public Justice, and Campaigns for People, who have awarded him with their Thomas Paine Award.  Smitty has also received the U.S. Environmental Protection Agency’s Environmental Excellence Award.  Smitty has served on four commissions that looked at the future of the utility industry in Texas and has testified on more than 100 occasions on environmental and energy policy.  He has also been received the Austin Chronicle's critics' choice award for "Best People's Lobbyist".2 In 2018, Smitty became the executive director of TxETRA, a non-profit dedicated to advancing electric vehicle use in Texas.

Activities
Public Citizen Texas takes credit for influencing the passing of laws requiring Texas to develop 5,880 Megawatts of new renewable energy and creating the Texas Emissions Reductions Plan, which reduces emissions from Texas diesels by 30% and gives incentives for purchasing of more efficient new cars and trucks.2

They are also credited with the establishment and strengthening of the Texas Ethics Commission and strengthening Texas’ “Lemon Law” to require car makers to address consumer complaints within 45 days, or else fully refund consumers.  Additionally they helped end a "grandfathering" loophole that allowed older power plants run without emissions controls, and improved safety requirements at the South Texas Nuclear Generating Station and the Comanche Peak Nuclear Power Plant.2

Internship program
Public Citizen Texas has hosted over 340 interns since its founding.  They are given challenging research tasks and often are given the opportunity to speak to government officials and other reform groups and draft proposed legislation.2

Other organizations
Public Citizen Texas is associated with other organization including: Public Citizen, the SEED Coalition, Texans for Public Justice, the Sierra Club, ReEnergize Texas, the Gray Panthers, Clean Water Action, Nuke Free Texas and Coal Block.2

Notes

  Official website
 Caraway, Jennifer. Public Citizen Turns 20.  Texas Public Citizen News. August 2004
 Guldin, Public Citizen Celebrates 20 Years in Texas. Texas Public Citizen News Sept. 2004

Organizations based in Austin, Texas
Public Citizen